Csaba Lajos Lantos (born 28 January 1962) is a Hungarian economist-sociologist, banker, investor and politician. Since 2022, he has been Minister of Energy in the Fifth Orbán Government.

References 

Living people
1962 births
21st-century Hungarian politicians
Members of the fifth Orbán government

Hungarian economists
Hungarian sociologists
Hungarian bankers
Hungarian businesspeople
Energy ministers of Hungary